Michelle Veintimilla (born November 11, 1992) is an Ecuadorian American film, television, and theater actress. She played the role of villain Firefly in the second and fourth seasons of the Fox television series Gotham. Recently, she portrayed Carmen Guerra on FOX's The Gifted and Marie Joblanski on the Netflix crime drama series Seven Seconds. Recently, she starred as Hayden on the Netflix science fiction miniseries, The I-Land.

Career 
Veintimilla was studying as a senior at Carnegie Mellon University when she got the job offer to perform in the musical The Visit in 2014. She portrayed the DC Comics' super-villain Bridgit Pike/Firefly in the series Gotham. She would appear in  two episodes of season two. After being replaced by Camila Perez for the third season, she returned to the role with the fourth season episode "Mandatory Brunch Meeting".

Veintimilla appeared on Broadway in the musical version of The Visit, playing the younger version of Chita Rivera's character. She most recently appeared in a developmental presentation of The Civilians new musical Store Brand, written and composed by Zack Zadek.

In August 2019, it was confirmed that Veintimilla will star as Hayden in the Netflix science fiction miniseries, The I-Land, which premiered on September 12, 2019.

In 2020, Veintimilla starred in the ABC series The Baker and the Beauty, playing one of the love interests of the main character.

In 2022, she played Actress/Bachelorette/Casting Director in the world premiere production of Which Way to the Stage off-Broadway.

Filmography

Film

Television

References

External links 
 

1992 births
Living people
American film actresses
American television actresses
21st-century American actresses
Carnegie Mellon University alumni
Place of birth missing (living people)